The Sebiș is a right tributary of the river Crișul Alb in Romania. It discharges into the Crișul Alb near the town Sebiș. It is formed at the confluence of two headwaters Moneasa and Dezna.

Tributaries

The following rivers are tributaries to the river Sebiș:

Left: Dezna, Vâlceaua, Laz
Right: Moneasa, Negrișoara, Minezel

References

Rivers of Romania
Rivers of Arad County